Troels Wörsel (November 10, 1950 - December 12, 2018) was a Danish painter active in Cologne and Pietrasanta.

Biography
Troels Wörsel was born in Aarhus, Danmark. He was self-taught and in the 1970s, became interested in pop and conceptual art. Philosophical issues such as the relationship between space and time characterised his art. In 1981, he contributed to the pioneer exhibition Rundschau Deutschland at Munich and Cologne and at the Bildwechsel at  Akademie der Künste in Berlin. He represented Denmark at the fifty-Second Venice Biennale in 2007.

In 1995 Wörsel was awarded the Eckersberg Medal, and in 2002 he won Carnegie Art Award  first prize and in 2004 he received the Thorvaldsen Medal. 
He died during 2018 at Cologne, Germany. His work is displayed at the Museum of Modern Art in New York City and the Centre Pompidou in Paris.

References

External links
Gallery Engstroem entry
 Troels Wörsel at Aurel Scheibler 

20th-century Danish painters
21st-century Danish painters
1950 births
 2018 deaths
Recipients of the Thorvaldsen Medal
Recipients of the Eckersberg Medal
Danish contemporary artists